Interstate 410 is a loop around San Antonio, Texas.

Interstate 410  may also refer to:
Interstate 10 in Arizona, a portion of which was formerly known as I-410
Interstate 410 (Baton Rouge, Louisiana), a cancelled loop through the Baton Rouge metropolitan area partially retained as I-110
Interstate 410 (New Orleans, Louisiana), a cancelled southern bypass of the New Orleans metropolitan area known as the Dixie Freeway

10-4
4